is a song by Japanese band My Little Lover. It was released as a single on August 21, 1995, and is currently the band's biggest hit single.

Promotion 

The song was used as the theme song for the Japanese drama Owaranai Natsu, starring Asaka Seto, Ryuichi Ohura, and LaSalle Ishii.

Versions 

In My Little Lover's discography, "Hello, Again (Mukashi kara Aru Basho)" has been recorded in studio three times: the original, the acoustic version on Organic (2002) and the differently arranged acoustic version on Acoakko (2008). The original appears on the single, Evergreen (1995), Singles (2001) and the greatest hits disc of Akko (2006).

Track listing

Chart rankings

Certifications and sales

Juju version

Hello, Again (Mukashi kara Aru Basho) was covered by Japanese R&B singer Juju in 2010, used in commercials for the Sony Alpha digital camera. The cover was very popular, reaching #1 on RIAJ's Digital Track Chart, causing the original to chart again and prompted Juju to release a cover album of female Japanese vocalists' songs, Request.

Track listing 
All tracks arranged by Akihisa Matsuura.

Chart rankings

Certifications and sales

Release history

Other cover versions
Mi (2008, album I Love Music: Mi Best Collection)
Runa Miyoshida (2007, album Pure Flavor #1: Color of Love)
Kana Hanazawa (2019, anime Afterlost)
Ayaka (2021, video game Tales of Arise)

References

1995 singles
2010 singles
My Little Lover songs
Japanese television drama theme songs
Oricon Weekly number-one singles
RIAJ Digital Track Chart number-one singles
Juju (singer) songs
1995 songs
Onenation singles
Songs written by Takeshi Kobayashi
Song recordings produced by Takeshi Kobayashi